Mamatin-e Sofla (also Romanized as Māmātīn-e Soflá; also known as Māmātain, Māmātain-e Pā’īn, Māmātayn-e Pā’īn, Māmātīn, Māmā Tīn-e Pā’īn, and Mamatīnī) is a village in Howmeh-ye Sharqi Rural District, in the Central District of Ramhormoz County, Khuzestan Province, Iran. At the 2006 census, its population was 172, in 32 families.

References 

Populated places in Ramhormoz County